Adam Anthony Nichols (born 14 September 1962) is an English former footballer who played in the Football League as a defender for Colchester United.

Career

Born in Ilford, London, Nichols started his career at Ipswich Town as an apprentice, making nine youth team appearances, scoring eight times, and scoring twice in 27 reserve team games. He signed professional terms in 1979 but failed to break into the Ipswich first-team squad. He then moved to South Africa to play for Wits University.

In September 1983, Colchester United manager Cyril Lea signed Nichols on non-contract terms, making his debut for the club on 18 October in a 1–0 win against Bury at Layer Road in the Fourth Division, coming on as a substitute for Perry Groves. He made six league appearances for the club and scored once in a 6–0 demolition of Hartlepool United on 3 December 1983. His final appearance came in a 1–1 draw against Wrexham on 2 January 1984.

2015 attack 
In January 2015 Nichols was working for a designer clothes delivery company, and was brutally attacked. An appeal was made on BBC Crimewatch to find the attackers.

References

1962 births
Living people
Footballers from Ilford
English footballers
Association football defenders
Ipswich Town F.C. players
Bidvest Wits F.C. players
Colchester United F.C. players
English Football League players